The Lynwood Pacific Electric Railway Depot is a former railway station of the Pacific Electric Railway, located in Lynwood, California. Originally in service on the Santa Ana Line, the station building was moved after the construction of the Century Freeway and now resides in downtown Lynwood.

History
The first Lynwood station was established by the Los Angeles Inter-Urban Electric Railway in 1905 as part of the West Santa Ana Branch. It was little more than a simple shed adjacent to sugar beet fields at the intersection of Long Beach Boulevard. The line and station was folded into the new Pacific Electric Railway in 1911. In 1917, the Lynwood Company constructed a new Depot designed in the Mission Revival style by architect, Bernard Maybeck for the railroad in exchange for other nearby grade and level crossing improvements. Interurban service was discontinued in 1958 with the rest of the Santa Ana Line.

The Depot building was added to the U.S. National Register of Historic Places on September 25, 1974. It was also catalogued by the Historic American Buildings Survey in 1908. The building was acquired by the City of Lynwood as a gift from Southern Pacific (successors to the PE). When the Century Freeway was constructed through Lynwood in the late 1980s, the Depot building was moved to its current location at 3780 Martin Luther King Jr. Boulevard near the entrance to Lynwood City Park. The modern Long Beach Boulevard station serves the Los Angeles Metro Rail C Line light rail near Lynwood Depot's original location.

See also
Bellflower station — another existing PE station building on the Santa Ana Branch
Watts Station — another existing PE station building listed on the NRHP

References
Notes

Citations

External links

5166 at Lynwood Station, February 24, 1957 — via the Mount Lowe Preservation Society
LAMTA 312 at Lynwood Station, January 28, 1956 — via the Mount Lowe Preservation Society

Pacific Electric stations
Lynwood, California
Railway stations in the United States opened in 1905
Railway stations closed in 1958
1905 establishments in California
Railway stations on the National Register of Historic Places in California